Tell Beit Mirsim is an archaeological site in Israel, on the border between the lowlands of Shfela and Mount Hebron. It is located in the eastern region of Lachish about 20 kilometers southwest of Hebron and about 13 kilometers southeast of Lachish.

Excavations 
It was excavated for four seasons (1926, 1928, 1930 and 1932) by William F. Albright.

The excavation revealed 10 or 11 strata dating from the late 3rd millennium BC to around 589 BC. The site is of particular importance for the archeology of Palestine, since the ceramics in the individual layers were observed particularly well and published quickly. This pottery corpus has long been considered the standard for archeology in the region.

"The strict separation of earth layers, or archaeological sediments, also allowed the strict separation of ceramic assemblages".

Town plan 

The site has "a town plan characteristic of the Kingdom of Judah that is also known from other sites" including,  Beit Shemesh, Tell en-Nasbeh, Khirbet Qeiyafa and Beersheba.

"A casemate wall was built at all of these sites and the city’s houses next to it incorporated the casemates as one of the dwelling’s rooms. This model is not known from any Canaanite, Philistine or Kingdom of Israel site."

Identification of the site 
Albright identified the ruin with the biblical city Dvir (Debir), or Kiryat Sefer by another name. He hoped to find an ancient archive there. This identification is not currently accepted by the archaeological community. Khirbet Rabud is seen as the more likely location.

References

Bibliography

 (pp. 279,  290)

 (p. 349)
 (p. 379)

External links
Survey of Western Palestine, Map 20:   IAA, Wikimedia commons 

1926 archaeological discoveries
Archaeological sites in Israel
Ruins in Israel
Tells (archaeology)